Elwyn Gordon "Moe" Morris (January 3, 1921 – February 6, 2000) was a Canadian ice hockey player who played in the National Hockey League with the Toronto Maple Leafs and New York Rangers between 1943 and 1949. The rest of his career, which lasted from 1939 to 1955, was spent in various minor leagues. He was born in Toronto, Ontario.

Playing career
Morris played 135 games over a five-year period from 1944 to 1949 in the National Hockey League for the Toronto Maple Leafs and New York Rangers. He scored 13 goals and added 29 assists for 42 points. He won the Stanley Cup in 1945 with the Toronto Maple Leafs. He also played for the Toronto Marlboros (Ontario Hockey Association) starting in 1943, until being called up by the Maple Leafs.

Career statistics

Regular season and playoffs

References

External links
 

1921 births
2000 deaths
Canadian ice hockey defencemen
Canadian expatriates in the United States
Ice hockey people from Toronto
New York Rangers players
Ontario Hockey Association Senior A League (1890–1979) players
Pittsburgh Hornets players
Providence Reds players
Stanley Cup champions
Toronto Maple Leafs players
Toronto Marlboros players